Apollinarism or Apollinarianism is a Christological heresy proposed by Apollinaris of Laodicea (died 390) that argues that Jesus had a human body and sensitive human soul, but a divine mind and not a human rational mind, the Divine Logos taking the place of the latter. It was deemed heretical in 381 and virtually died out within the following decades.

History
The Trinity had been recognized at the Council of Nicea in 325, but debate about exactly what it meant continued. A rival to the more common belief that Jesus Christ had two natures was monophysitism ("one nature"), the doctrine that Christ had only one nature. Apollinarism and Eutychianism were two forms of monophysitism. Apollinaris's rejection of Christ having a human mind was considered an over-reaction to Arianism and its teaching that Christ was a lesser god.

Theodoret charged Apollinaris with confounding the persons of the Godhead and giving in to the heretical ways of Sabellius. Basil of Caesarea accused him of abandoning the literal sense of the scripture, and taking it up wholly with the allegorical sense. His views were condemned in a Synod at Alexandria, under Athanasius of Alexandria, in 362, and later subdivided into several different heresies, the main ones of which were the Polemians and the Antidicomarianites.

Apollinaris, considering the rational soul and spirit as essentially liable to sin and capable, at its best, of only precarious efforts, saw no way of saving Christ's impeccability and the infinite value of Redemption, except by the elimination of the human spirit from Jesus' humanity, and the substitution of the Divine Logos in its stead. Apollinarism was declared to be a heresy in 381 by the First Council of Constantinople.

Neo-Apollinarism 
Christian philosopher William Lane Craig has proposed a neo-Apollinarian Christology in which the divine Logos completes the human nature of Christ. Craig says his proposal is tentative and he welcomes critique and interaction from other scholars.

Craig also clarifies "what I called a Neo-Apollinarian Christological model" by stating that

See also

References

Sources

Artemi, E., «Mia physis of God Logos sesarkomeni» a)The analysis of this phrase according to  Cyril of Alexandria b)The analysis of this phrase according to Apollinaris of Laodicea», Ecclesiastic Faros t. ΟΔ (2003), 293 – 304.
McGrath, Alister. 1998. Historical Theology, An Introduction to the History of Christian Thought. Oxford: Blackwell Publishers. Chapter 1.
 

4th-century Christianity
Christian terminology
Heresy in ancient Christianity
Nature of Jesus Christ